Zhang Zhiying (born 19 July 1973) is a retired Chinese shot putter.

She won the silver medals at the 1992 World Junior Championships and the 1995 Asian Championships.

Her personal best throw is 19.23 metres, achieved in May 1992 in Hangzhou.

References

1973 births
Living people
Chinese female shot putters
Place of birth missing (living people)
20th-century Chinese women